The Mayor of Crystal Lake, Illinois presides at all meetings of the city council of Crystal Lake, Illinois, and is otherwise the head of the city government for all ceremonial purposes, and any other purposes determined by the city council, or in emergencies, by the governor. The mayor has no regular administrative duties, as the city operates under a council-manager form of government.

Incorporated on September 23, 1914, Crystal Lake's population stands at 40,743 at the 2010 census.

List
(Source:)

References

Crystal Lake
Mayors
1914 establishments in Illinois